Haytham Kamal Khalifa (born 17 November 1987) is an Egyptian basketball player for Al Ittihad and the Egyptian national team, where he participated at the 2014 FIBA Basketball World Cup.

References

1987 births
Living people
Egyptian men's basketball players
Centers (basketball)
2014 FIBA Basketball World Cup players
Al Ittihad Alexandria Club basketball players
Alexandria Sporting Club players